De Lisle is an 1828 novel by the British writer Elizabeth Caroline Grey, originally published in three volumes. It is part of the then-fashionable genre of silver fork novels set amongst the British upper classes during the later Regency era. It revolves around the marriage of the protagonist Hubert De Lisle to Lady Rosamond Trevannon. Although a good and faithful wife, her increasingly neurotic husband becomes extremely suspicious of her.

References

Bibliography
 Hudspeth, Robert N. The Letters of Margaret Fuller: 1850 and undated. Cornell University Press,  2018.
 Summers, Montague. A Gothic Bibliography. Dalcassian Publishing Company,  1940.

1828 British novels
Novels set in London
Novels by Elizabeth Caroline Grey